An Giang is a province of Vietnam. It is located in the Mekong Delta, in the southwestern part of the country.

Geography 

An Giang occupies a position in the upper reaches of the Mekong Delta. The Hậu Giang and Tiền Giang branches of the Mekong River are the dominant geographical features of the province. With the exception of the west, most of An Giang is fairly flat and is criss-crossed by many canals and small rivers. This terrain has led to An Giang being a significant agricultural center, producing significant quantities of rice.

The Cấm Mountains, also known as the Thất Sơn range or the "Seven Mountains", are located in the western Tịnh Biên District. Followers of the Bửu Sơn Kỳ Hương tradition, founded in An Giang in 1849, refer to these mountains as Bửu Sơn, "Precious Mountains".

Administrative divisions 
An Giang is subdivided into 11 district-level sub-divisions:

 Districts:
 An Phú: 2 towns and 12 rural communes
 Châu Phú: 1 town and 12 rural communes
 Châu Thành: 1 town and 12 rural communes
 Chợ Mới: 2 towns and 16 rural communes
 Phú Tân: 2 towns and 16 rural communes
 Thoại Sơn: 3 towns and 14 rural communes
 Tịnh Biên: 3 towns and 11 rural communes
 Tri Tôn: 2 towns and 13 rural communes
 District-level town:
 Tân Châu: 5 wards and 9 rural communes
 Provincial cities:
 Châu Đốc: 5 wards and 2 rural communes
 Long Xuyên: 11 wards and 2 rural communes (capital of province)

 They are further subdivided into 16 commune-level towns (or townlets), 119 communes, and 21 wards (156 in total).

Demographics 

An Giang first became a province in 1832, having been settled by the Vietnamese migrants moving southwards in search of new land. It is believed that An Giang was once an important center of the 1st millennium Óc Eo culture, presumably owing to its position on the river. Traditionally, An Giang has been known for its silk industry.

An Giang is home to a substantial number of people from Vietnam's ethnic minorities. Due to the province's proximity to Cambodia, the Khmer Krom are the largest non-Vietnamese group. Other groups, such as the Chams and ethnic Chinese (Hoa), are also found in An Giang.

Notable people 
Tôn Đức Thắng, prominent Communist and former President of the Democratic Republic of Vietnam; later became the first President of the Socialist Republic of Vietnam (Long Xuyên).
Nguyễn Ngọc Thơ, vice-president of the Republic of Vietnam before April 30, 1975 (Long Xuyên).
Chau Sen Cocsal Chhum, Khmer Krom and Prime Minister of Cambodia in 1962.

Vương Trung Hiếu, writer (Thoại Sơn).
Trịnh Bửu Hoài, writer (Châu Đốc).
Hoàng Hiệp, musician (Chợ Mới).

Võ Tòng Xuân, academic, agronomist and former rector of An Giang University (Tri Tôn).

 Huỳnh Phú Sổ, founder of the Hòa Hảo sect of Buddhism (Phú Tân).

 Thoại Ngọc Hầu, general of Nguyễn dynasty (Chợ Mới).

Đoàn Minh Huyên, founder of the Bửu Sơn Kỳ Hương tradition.
Vũ Cát Tường, the singer of Vietnam.

See also 
Basa fish

External links 

An Giang province: To open job transaction floor 2015

 
Provinces of Vietnam